Nyhavn 13 is a historic townhouse overlooking the Nyhavn Canal in central Copenhagen, Denmark. With roots dating back to the late 17th century, it owes its current appearance to a heightening of the building with two floors in 1842. Notable former residents include the businessman Abraham Marcus Hirschsprung and the painter and educator Wilhelm Kyhn. The building was listed in the Danish registry of protected buildings and places in 1945.

History

17th and 18th centuries

Nyhavn 13 was built in circa 1681. It was by 1689 as No. 7 in St. Ann's East Quarter owned by Evert Holst. It was by 1756 owned by Jacob Iversen Skelde. It was for many years operated as a tavern under the name Norske Løve (Norwegian Lion). An advertisement from Aannonceavisen in 1764 offers "old rum" at 28 skilling, and grated anthers at 16 mark per lispundet.

At the time of the 1787 census, No. 7 was home to three households. Christen Sørensen Kild, a skipper, resided in the building with his wife Anna Sørens Datter, a five-year-old daughter and a maid. Christian Wilhelmsen, a skipper, resided in the building with his wife Christiana Maria, their four-year-old son, an 11-year-old son from the wife's first marriage, an eight-year-old orphaned girl and a maid. Bent Mortensen, another skipper, resided in the building with his wife Kirsten Svensdatter and a maid.

19th century
The property was by 1801 owned by the 55-year-old widow Ane Kelsen. She lived there with her 19-year-old daughter Anne Kirstine Kelsen and her 31-year-old husband Ole Holm (a skipper), a maid, the 38-year-old skipper Hendrich Schade and the 31-year-old Russian Johan Rosloff v. Kirsten Andersdatter, a 25-year-old divorced innkeeper, was together with a maid also residing in the building.	

The property was again listed as No. 7 in the new cadastre of 1806. It was at that time still owned by Ole Holm. Abraham Marcus Hirschsprung resided in the building when he founded a small tobacco shop at the corner of Østergade (No. 2) and Kongens Nytorv in 1826. It would as A.M. Hirschsprung & Sønner later grow to become the largest Danish manufacturer of tobacco products.

No. 7 was home to a total of three households at the time of the 1834 census. Ane Kestine Rechoff (aged 53) and Andrea Cecilia Clausen (aged 27), two widows of ship captains, each of them with two children, resided on the ground floor with a lodger (a ship captain) and a maid. Marcus Rechoff, another ship captain and probably a son of Ane Rechoff, and himself a widower, resided on the first floor with his six children (aged six to 15) and one maid. Both Rechoff and his eldest son were at sea at the time of the census. Vilhelm Kyhn, then a 21-year-old art student, resided alone on the third floor. Andreas Ahlstrand, a master shoemaker, resided in the basement with his wife Marie Christine Ahlstrand, two shoemakers and two apprentices.

No. 7 was home to 17 residents at the time of the 1840 census. Andrea Clausen (ground floor) and Ane Caroline Reehoff	(second floor) now occupied each their floor. Carl Frederik Wilhelm Egtved, a royal stableman, was a new tenant on the first floor. He lived there with his wife Maria Magrrethe Flindt, a lodger and a maid.

The basement was later operated as a tavern with live music under the name Neptuns Hal. Skippers Shop, Nyhavn's last ship chandler, opened on the ground floor.

The property was home to 18 residents in six households at the 1845 census. Johan Hendrik Wilsløw, an artistic turner, resided in the building with his wife Christiane Marie Bruun, their foster daughter Hanne Petrea Dorthea Søeborg, his cousin Karen Marie Larsen and the clerk Christian Frederik August Olsen. Morten Andersen, a ship captain, resided in another apartment with his wife Marie Cathrine født Andersen, their two daughters (aged 13 and 18) and one maid. Panlen Ludvig Sandhølt, an artillery captain, resided in the building with his colleague Søren Andersen. Carl Christian August Fisher, a jurist, resided in the building with his 17-year-old brother Wilhelm Heinrich Ludvig Johannes Fischer and one maid. Susanne Chathrine Indehl, a 52-year-old widow, resided in the building on her own. Jens Olsen Evetoft, an innkeeper, resided in the building with his wife Susanne Rasmussen.

The  property was home to 25 residents in seven households at the 1850 census. Ole Olsen Lier, a master shoemaker, resided on the ground floor with his wife Wilhelmine Lier (mée Inddahl). Anton Gravengaard, a sailor, resided on the ground floor with his wife Caroline Steinmand, their three children (aged seven to 13) and four lodgers. Ole Jacob Lier, a master painter and the father of the master shoemaker on the ground floor, resided on the first floor with his wife Laura Lier født Lyneburg, their nine-year-old daughter Thora Lier and one maid. Jacob Fredericke Lynburg, a 76-year-old master tailor, was also a resident of the first floor apartment. Per Andreas Ferdiand Jensen, a senior clerk in the Ministry of Defense, resided on the second floor with his wife Anne Kirstine Wichberg and one maid. Elisabeth Helsted (née Stendrup), a widow, resided on the third floor with her two sons (aged 15 and 20) and one lodger. Niels Sørensen, a workman, resided in the garret with his wife Christine Nielsen.

The property was home to 30 residents in six households at the 1860 census. The 77-year-old widow Vilhelmine Lier was still a resident of the building. Ludvig Christian Wittus, a grocer (urtekræmmer), resided in the building with his wife	Sine Wittus (née Lier), their five children (aged four to 16), one apprentice, one male servant and one maid. Caroline Jensen, widow of a civil servant, resided in the building with her 39-year-old daughter Johanne Jensen and one maid. Frederik W. Petersen, a theatre controller, resided in the building with his wife Jensine Petersen, their three-year-old daughter Olivia Petersen and the wife's 41-year-old relative Aurora Tømmerby. Hector Frederik Hansen, a textile merchant (hørkræmmer), resided in the building with his wife Caroline Dorothea Hansen (née Møller), their three daughters (aged two to six), one apprentice and one maid. Gotfred Georg Weyby	, a master tailor, resided in the building with his wife Sophie Juliane Elisabeth Weyby (née Benhe), their two daughters (aged one and four) and one maid.

20th century

The building was listed on the Danish Registry of Protected Buildings and Places in 1945.

Today
The building is today owned by restaurateur Hans Baagøe. Café Klods Hans is based in the ground floor.

References

External links

Listed residential buildings in Copenhagen
Houses completed in 1681